Chris Turner (born February 1, 1960) is a Canadian retired soccer goalkeeper who played professionally in the North American Soccer League and Major Indoor Soccer League.  He also earned four caps with the Canadian national team.

Professional
In 1979, Turner signed with the San Jose Earthquakes where he became a regular in the nets.  He played for the Detroit Lightning during the 1979–80 Major Indoor Soccer League season.  In 1981, he played for the Los Angeles Aztecs.  After the Aztecs folded at the end of the season, the San Diego Sockers picked up Turner in the Dispersal Draft.  He played only one game for the Sockers before moving to the Seattle Sounders for the 1983 season.  When the Sounders folded at the end of the season, Turner moved north to the Vancouver Whitecaps.

National team
In 1978, he began playing for the Canada U-20 men's national soccer team which qualified for the 1979 FIFA World Youth Championship.  He played in all three Canadian games in the tournament.  On June 19, 1983, he earned his first cap with the Canadian national team in a 0–2 loss to Scotland.

References

External links
NASL/MISL stats

1960 births
Living people
Soccer players from Vancouver
Canadian soccer players
Canadian expatriate soccer players
Canada men's youth international soccer players
Canada men's international soccer players
Expatriate soccer players in the United States
Canadian expatriate sportspeople in the United States
Detroit Lightning players
Los Angeles Aztecs players
Major Indoor Soccer League (1978–1992) players
North American Soccer League (1968–1984) indoor players
North American Soccer League (1968–1984) players
San Jose Earthquakes (1974–1988) players
San Diego Sockers (NASL) players
Seattle Sounders (1974–1983) players
Vancouver Whitecaps (1974–1984) players
Association football goalkeepers